Osetrovka is a rural locality (a selo) and the administrative center of Osetrovskoye Rural Settlement, Verkhnemamonsky District, Voronezh Oblast, Russia. The population was 799 as of 2010. There are 8 streets.

Geography 
Osetrovka is located 8 km southeast of Verkhny Mamon (the district's administrative centre) by road. Verkhny Mamon is the nearest rural locality.

References 

Rural localities in Verkhnemamonsky District